Mojtame-ye Emam (also Romanized as Mojtame`-ye Emām) is a village in Cheraghabad Rural District, Tukahur District, Minab County, Hormozgan Province, Iran. At the 2006 census, its population was 2,260, in 480 families.

References 

Populated places in Minab County